MDMB-5Br-INACA is an indazole-3-carboxamide derivative which has been sold as a designer drug. Surprisingly it appears to produce cannabinoid activity despite the lack of a "tail" group at the indazole 1-position, but is of relatively low potency and has been encountered being misrepresented as other illicit drugs such as MDMA.

See also 
 4F-MDMB-BINACA
 5F-ADB
 MDMB-FUBINACA

References 

Cannabinoids
Designer drugs
Indazolecarboxamides
Bromoarenes
Methyl esters